Mohamed Gnontcha Kone (born 12 December 1993) is an Ivorian-born Burkinabé football player.

Career

Club
On 4 August 2016, Kone signed for Apollon Limassol, before joining Karmiotissa Pano Polemidion on loan the same day.

In January 2017, Kone signed for Uzbek League side Lokomotiv Tashkent, being presented as a new player on 7 March 2017.

On 26 March 2018, Luch Minsk announced the signing of Kone.

Kone joined the Tampa Bay Rowdies on 5 February 2019.

In 2021, Kone signed with the National Independent Soccer Association's New Amsterdam FC. Kone debuted for NAFC during the club's Legends Cup match against Chattanooga FC on 16 April 2021.

Kone signed with FC Tucson on August 5, 2021.

International
On 21 August 2017, Kone was called up to the Burkina Faso national team for the first time, for their 2018 FIFA World Cup qualification matches against Senegal on 2 and 5 September 2017.

Career statistics

Club

References

External links
 

1993 births
Living people
Ivorian footballers
Burkinabé footballers
Association football defenders
Ivorian expatriate footballers
Burkinabé expatriate footballers
Expatriate footballers in Moldova
Expatriate footballers in Cyprus
Expatriate footballers in Uzbekistan
Expatriate footballers in Belarus
Expatriate soccer players in the United States
Africa Sports d'Abidjan players
FC Saxan players
CSF Bălți players
Apollon Limassol FC players
Karmiotissa FC players
PFC Lokomotiv Tashkent players
FC Luch Minsk (2012) players
Tampa Bay Rowdies players
New Amsterdam FC players
FC Tucson players
National Independent Soccer Association players
USL League One players
21st-century Burkinabé people